The Warner House is a historic house at 307 Town Street in East Haddam, Connecticut.  Built roughly in the mid-18th century, it is notable for its high quality interior woodwork and hardware, the latter of which were probably made by some of its owners.  The house was listed on the National Register of Historic Places in 1987.  The house is now owned by Connecticut Landmarks, which is in 2018 preparing to open it as a historic house museum.

Description and history
The Warner House is located in a rural-suburban setting of western East Haddam, on the west side of Town Street (Connecticut Route 82) near its junction with Petticoat Lane.  It is a -story wood-frame structure, five bays wide, with a side-gable roof, large central chimney, and clapboarded exterior.  The main entrance is at the center of the symmetrical front facade, sheltered by a gabled portico supported by round columns.  The entrance is flanked by simple pilasters.  The interior follows a typical period center-chimney plan, with high-quality wood paneling around the main parlor fireplace, and elaborate millwork in the second parlor.

The house was built in 1738 by John Warner, and was restyled in 1790, when most of its fine woodwork was added.  John Warner was a noted regional maker of interior hardware (hinges, latches, and so on), whose work is probably in this house.  His son and grandson, the next occupants of the house, were blacksmiths.  The house was purchased in 1936 by Frederic T. Palmer, a restoration architect, who undertook a careful restoration of the house.  Palmer was a trustee and boardmember of Connecticut Landmarks, who received the property after the death of his partner in 2005.

See also
National Register of Historic Places listings in Middlesex County, Connecticut

References

External links
Palmer-Warner House at Connecticut Landmarks

Houses on the National Register of Historic Places in Connecticut
Houses in East Haddam, Connecticut
Houses completed in 1738
National Register of Historic Places in Middlesex County, Connecticut